Madan Mahal - Rewa Intercity Express  is a daily superfast express train of the Indian Railways, which runs between  of Jabalpur, one of the important city & military cantonment hubs of Central Indian state Madhya Pradesh and Rewa,  Madhya Pradesh.

Number and nomenclature
The number allowted for the train is :
22189 - From Rewa to Jabalpur
22190 - From Jabalpur to Rewa

The name "Intercity Express" refers to the chair car class service of the Intercity Express (Indian Railways) trains, hence the name.

Routes and halts
The train goes via Katni Junction. The important halts of the train are:

  (Jabalpur)
 
 Katni Junction
 Maihar
 Satna

Locomotive
The train is hauled by ET WDM3 diesel locomotive of the Itarsi Shed.

Coach composite
The train consists of 11 coaches as follows:
2 AC CHAIR CAR
5 RESERVED CHAIR CAR
5 UNRESERVED CHAIR CAR

References 

Rail transport in Madhya Pradesh
Transport in Jabalpur
Transport in Rewa, Madhya Pradesh
Railway services introduced in 2002
Intercity Express (Indian Railways) trains